The Herter Farmstead is an estate with a historic farm house and several outbuildings in Walton, Nebraska. The two-story house was built in 1876 for Abraham Herter, an immigrant from Switzerland. In 1892, his son, Jacob W. Herter, decided to redesign the house in the Queen Anne style, with a tower and classical columns. Edward, the third-generation property owned, inherited the house in 1960, followed by his daughter Norma in 1973, who lived here with her husband, Wayne Hagaman. The property has been listed on the National Register of Historic Places since July 24, 2000.

References

National Register of Historic Places in Lancaster County, Nebraska
Queen Anne architecture in Nebraska
Buildings and structures completed in 1876
1876 establishments in Nebraska
Farms on the National Register of Historic Places in Nebraska